Saudis or Saudi Arabians are the citizens and nationals of Saudi Arabia. They are mainly composed of Arabs and live in the five historical Regions: Najd, Hijaz, Asir, Tihamah and Al-Ahsa; the regions which the Kingdom of Saudi Arabia was founded on or what was formerly known as the Kingdom of Hejaz and Nejd in the Arabian Peninsula. Saudis speak one of the dialects of Peninsular Arabic, including the Hejazi, Najdi, Gulf and Southern Arabic dialects (which includes Bareqi), as a mother tongue. According to the 2010 census, Saudi nationals represented approximately 31,335,377 making up 86.1% of the total population. Saudi Arabia is a state governed by absolute monarchy, with the king as its head of state. The word Saudis refer to the name of the ruling family in the Kingdom of Saudi Arabia today as an inclusive name for the inhabitants of the country.

Census
The Saudi population as of the 2010 official census was 19,335,377, making up 74.1% of the total population. The remaining population has 6,755,178 non-nationals, representing 25.9%.

The first official population census of Saudi Arabia was in 1974. It had 6,218,361 Saudi nationals and 791,105 non-nationals for a total of 7,009,466. Of those, 5,147,056 people were settled and the number of nomads recorded were 1.86 million.

Until the 1960s, much of the population was nomadic or seminomadic; due to rapid economic and urban growth, more than 95% of the population now is settled. 80% of Saudis live in three major urban centers—Riyadh, Jeddah, or Dammam. Some cities and oases have densities of more than 1,000 people per square kilometer (2,600/mile²). Despite the rapid growth in Saudi Arabia over the past decades, it is experiencing a rapid decline not only in mortality, but followed by fertility rates, which fell from about seven children on average per woman in the last century to 2.4 in 2016, based on the latest population survey conducted by the Saudi Authority for Statistics.
Saudi Arabia has lagged far behind in increasing its population compared to its neighbors such as Iraq and Syria.

Genetics

DNA tests of Y chromosomes from representative sample of Saudis were analyzed for composition and frequencies of haplogroups, a plurality (71.02%) belong to Haplogroup J1-M267. Other frequent haplogroups divided between Haplogroup J2-M172 (2.68%), A (0.83%), B (1.67%), E1b1a (1.50%), E1b1b (11.05%), G (1.34%), H (0.33%), L (1.00%), Q (1.34%), R1a (2.34%), R1b (0.83%), T (2.51%), P (1.50%).

Culture

The cultural setting of Saudi Arabia is Arab and Islam, and is deeply religious, conservative, traditional, and family oriented. Many attitudes and traditions are centuries-old, derived from Arab civilization. The Salafi Islamic movement, Which calls to understanding the Quran and the Hadith as understood by the Islamic prophet Muhammad and his companions, like Forbidding the establishment of a shrine on the graves of the righteous. Following the principle of "enjoining good and forbidding wrong", there are many limitations on behaviour and dress are strictly enforced both legally and socially, often more so than in other Muslim countries. Alcoholic beverages are prohibited, for example, and there is no theatre or public exhibition of films. Things are slowly changing now, as a couple of theatres opened in 2018.

Daily life is dominated by Islamic observance and ruling. Regardless of whether the inhabitants of that city are non Muslim, this is still observed. Although they are not required to fulfil religious rituals or obligations, clothing must meet a certain standard. Five times each day, Muslims are called to prayer from the minarets of mosques scattered throughout the country. Because Friday is the holiest day for Muslims, the weekend is Friday-Saturday. In accordance with Salafi doctrine, only two religious holidays, Eid al-Fitr and Eid al-Adha, were publicly recognized, until 2006 when a non-religious holiday, the 23 September national holiday (which commemorates the unification of the kingdom) was reintroduced.

Population 

The largest numbers of Saudis live in Egypt (ca 1,000,000).   The Map of Saudi People can be found on the right.

Social life and customs

Afro-Saudi

Afro-Saudis, who have Black African heritage, are the largest minority in Saudi Arabia and make up 10% of its population. They have lived in Saudi Arabia for thousands of years, even before Islam, and are fully assimilated with the rest of the population. They have also contributed a lot to Saudi culture. Other than genetics and physical characteristics, they are the same as any other Saudi.

Bedouin

A tiny portion of the original inhabitants of the area that is now Saudi were nomads known as Bedouin. They remain a significant and very influential minority of the indigenous Saudi population, though many who call themselves "bedou" no longer engage in "traditional tribal activities and settled ." According to authors Harvey Tripp and Peter North, Bedouin make up most of the judiciary, religious leaders and National Guard (which protects the throne) of the country. Bedouin culture is "actively" preserved by the government.

Urban

Some of the famous cities in the past were: Jeddah, Tabuk, Al-Ula, Jubbah, Madain Saleh, Riyadh, Tayma, Dumat al-Jandal, Al-Ahsa, Thaj, Tarout Island, Qaryat al-Faw, Al-Ukhdud, Ha'il, Qatif, Al-Yamamah, Mecca, Medina, Taif, Aflaj, Manfouha, Tirmidah, Al-Qassim Region, etc.

Greetings
Greetings in Saudi Arabia have been called "formal and proscribed" and lengthy. Saudis (men) tend "to take their time and converse for a bit when meeting". Inquiries "about health and family" are customary, but never about a man's wife, as this "is considered disrespectful."

Dress 

The religion and customs of Saudi Arabia dictate not only conservative dress for men and women, but a uniformity of dress unique to most of the West Asia. Traditionally, the different regions of Saudi have had different dress, but since the re-establishment of Saudi rule these have been reserved for festive occasions, and "altered if not entirely displaced" by the dress of the homeland of their rulers (i.e. Najd).

Until late 2019, all women were required to wear an abaya, a long cloak that covers all, but the hands, hair, and face in public. (Modest dress is compulsory for women in Islam but the color black for women and white for men is apparently based on tradition not religious scripture.) Foreign women were required to wear an abaya, but didn't need to cover their hair. Many Saudi women also normally wear a full face veil, such as a niqāb.  Women's clothes are often decorated with tribal motifs, coins, sequins, metallic thread, and appliques.

In recent years it is common to wear Western dress underneath the abaya.  (Foreign women in Saudi Arabia are "encouraged" by the religious police to wear an abaya, or at least cover their hair according to the New York Times. Authors Harvey Tripp and Peter North encourage women to wear an abaya in "more conservative" areas of the kingdom, i.e. in the interior.)

Saudi men and boys,  whatever their job or social status, wear the traditional dress called a thobe or thawb, which has been called the "Arabic dress". During warm and hot weather, Saudi men and boys wear white thobes. During the cool weather, wool thobes in dark colors are not uncommon. These are long white, brown or black cloaks trimmed in gold. Not wearing an igal is considered a sign of piety. The gutra is usually made of cotton and traditionally is either all white or a red and white checked. The gutra is worn folded into a triangle and centred on the head.

 Ghutrah is a traditional keffiyeh headdress worn by men in the Arabian peninsula. It is made of a square of usually finer cotton cloth ("scarf"), folded and wrapped in various styles (usually a triangle) around the head. It is commonly worn in areas with an arid climate, to provide protection from direct sun exposure, and also protection of the mouth and eyes from blown dust and sand.
 Agal is an item of Arab headgear constructed of cord which is fastened around the keffiyeh to hold it in place. The agal is usually black in colour.
Abaya is a women's hijab worn by women when leaving the house. It is a black cloak that covers the entire body except for the head, although some abayas also cover the top of the head.
Imama is a type of the turban headdress native to the region of Hejaz in modern-day western Saudi Arabia, it is but one version of Arabian turbans that have been worn in the Arabian Peninsula from the pre-Islamic era to the present day. but in general nowadays most Hejazis wear Shumagh instead.
 Thawb is the standard Arabic word for garment. It is ankle length, woven from wool or cotton, usually with long sleeves similar to a robe.
Bisht is a traditional long, white, brown or black Arabic cloak trimmed in gold worn by men. It is usually only worn for prestige on special occasions such as weddings, or in chilly weather.

More recently, Western dress, particularly T-shirts and jeans have become quite common leisure wear, particularly in Jeddah, Riyadh and Eastern Province.
Traditional footwear has been leather sandals but most footwear is now imported.

Religion

Islam is the state religion of Saudi Arabia and its law requires that all citizens be Muslims. The government does not legally protect the freedom of religion. Any overseas national attempting to acquire Saudi nationality must convert to Islam. Saudi Arabia has been criticized for its implementation of Islamic law and its poor human rights record.

Islam

The official form of Islam is Sunni of the Hanbali school, in its Salafi version. According to official statistics, 90% of Saudi citizens are Sunni Muslims, 10% are Shia. (More than 30% of the population is made up of foreign workers who are predominantly but not entirely Muslim.) It is unknown how many Ahmadi  there are in the country. The two holiest cities of Islam, Mecca and Medina, are in Saudi Arabia. For many reasons, non-Muslims are not permitted to enter the holy cities although some Western non-Muslims have been able to enter, disguised as Muslims.

Non-Muslims
The large number of foreign workers living in Saudi Arabia (7.5 million expatriates in 2013 A.D.) includes non-Muslims. Irreligious population also exists in Saudi Arabia. Although there is no official published statistics by the Saudi government, according to a Gallup poll, 5% of Saudi Arabians are irreligious. The evidence, however, is anecdotal but persistent. They may not enter Mecca either.

Policy of exclusion
According to scholar Bernard Lewis, the Saudi Arabian policy of excluding non-Muslims from permanent residence in the country is a continuation of an old and widely accepted Muslim policy.

The classical Arabic historians tell us that in the year 20 after the hijra (Muhammad's move from Mecca to Medina), corresponding to 641 of the Christian calendar, the Caliph Umar decreed that Jews and Christians should be removed from Arabia to fulfill an injunction the Prophet uttered on his deathbed: "Let there not be two religions in Arabia." The people in question were the Jews of the oasis of Khaybar in the north and the Christians of Najran in the south.

[The hadith] was generally accepted as authentic, and Umar put it into effect. ... Compared with European expulsions, Umar's decree was both limited and compassionate. It did not include southern and southeastern Arabia, which were not seen as part of Islam's holy land. ... the Jews and Christians of Arabia were resettled on lands assigned to them -- the Jews in Syria, the Christians in Iraq. The process was also gradual rather than sudden, and there are reports of Jews and Christians remaining in Khaybar and Najran for some time after Umar's edict.

But the decree was final and irreversible, and from then until now the holy land of the Hijaz has been forbidden territory for non-Muslims. According to the Hanbali school of Islamic jurisprudence, accepted by both the Saudis and the declaration's signatories, for a non-Muslim even to set foot on the sacred soil is a major offense. In the rest of the kingdom, non-Muslims, while admitted as temporary visitors, were not permitted to establish residence or practice their religion.

While Saudi Arabia does allow non-Muslims to live in Saudi Arabia to work or do business, they may not practice religion publicly. According to the government of the United Kingdom:

The public practice of any form of religion other than Islam is illegal; as is an intention to convert others. However, the Saudi authorities accept the private practice of religions other than Islam, and you can bring a Bible into the country as long as it is for your personal use. Importing larger quantities than this can carry severe penalties.

Saudi Arabia still gives citizenship to people from other countries.

See also

 Arabs
 Arab League
Bidoon

References

 
Arabs
Semitic-speaking peoples
Arabic-speaking people
Society of Saudi Arabia
Saudi Arabian culture